Konstantinou kai Elenis is a Greek TV sitcom broadcast on ANT1 channel, which aired from October 1998 until June 2000. The story revolves around the cohabitation of two people with very different personalities; an assistant professor of Byzantine Studies at the University of Athens named Konstantinos Katakouzinos and a waitress named Eleni Vlachaki. The series focuses on the clash of Konstaninos and Eleni's very different personalities as they live together and have to deal with each other.

The main stars are Haris Romas, who co-wrote the script along with Anna Hatzisofia, and Eleni Rantou. The character of Manthos is portrayed by Vasilis Koukouras whereas the character of Peggy, Matina and Nikolas are portrayed by Maria Lekaki, Kalirroi Miriagou and Stergios Nenes respectively. The series ran for two seasons, 1998-1999 and 1999-2000, and consisted of 68 episodes. Each episode lasts about 40–45 minutes. Reruns of the series are still being broadcast to date.

Konstantinou kai Elenis is widely considered the most successful Greek TV series of all time and maintains a huge cultural impact on the Greek-speaking world even to this day. The show is also one of the few Greek-produced that have achieved a cult status, scoring high viewership ratings for roughly twenty years after its finale and maintaining a dedicated fanbase.

Storyline 
Konstaninos' uncle dies and leaves two wills appointing as inheritors of his small mansion in Marousi, Athens his nephew, an assistant professor of Byzantine Studies at the University of Athens and Eleni, his gardener's daughter. The prospective inheritors and their lawyers do not know which will was written first as the second will would deem the first invalid. As they are both emotionally attached to the house, they decide to compromise and live together until the court's decision.

Konstaninos and Eleni's very different personalities conflict, leading them to major quarrels over sometimes unimportant things. Konstantinos, a narrow minded but extremely educated person, with good manners, obsessed with the Byzantine Empire, is a very conservative character who speaks puristic Greek and is very religious and superstitious. He also dislikes being in the company of others and hates every type of modern entertainment. Eleni works as a waitress at a bar, non educated with terrible manners, uses slang and often vulgar words and expressions, and is a very open minded and kind-hearted person. A typical young woman, she enjoys all kinds of modern entertainment and has many friends and many short-lived relationships. In many episodes, their mutual dislike even leads one of the two, or even both, to plot against the other to become the sole inheritor of the house.

Various other subplots play a significant role in many episodes, usually involving the most important supporting characters: Peggy is Eleni's closest friend, a waitress at the same bar and a talentless actress. Manthos, Konstantinos' closest friend and schoolmate, is the son of a rich industrialist who has multiple relationships including his most permanent one, Peggy. Matina is Konstantinos and Eleni's old friend and neighbour, a civil servant who is single, afraid that she'll die alone, and is obsessed with getting married. Nicolas is the bartender at the bar where Eleni and Peggy work and a very close friend of both.

Recording 

The show was mostly recorded at Paiania Studio in Attica, but the characters visited many areas inside and outside the city such as Arachova, Patmos and Hydra.

Cast and characters 
The main cast of the series includes Haris Romas and Eleni Rantou as Konstantinos and Eleni, the protagonists. The show also featured many popular actors and as guest stars in various episodes.

Main cast 
Haris Romas as "Konstantinos Katakouzinos": He is a grumpy, overly conservative and narrow-minded Byzantinologist, who works as an assistant professor at the University of Athens. He is also the author of an unpublished book called "The Sewer System in Byzantium", which he regards as a masterpiece, but nobody is interested in publishing it. Konstantinos has many peculiarities and is an extremely difficult person to deal with, let alone live with.
Eleni Rantou as "Eleni Vlachaki": She is a strong-willed and kind-hearted young woman, without any formal manners and rather uneducated. She works as a waitress in a night bar and is shown to have many short-lived relationships, which usually differ between episodes. Eleni calls Konstantinos by the nickname "Katakouzina", a pun on his name and the word "κουζίνα" meaning kitchen in Greek.
Maria Lekaki as "Peggy Karra (Panagiota Carachisaridou)": The closest friend of Eleni's. Her real name is Panagiota Carachisaridou, but she has adopted an "artistic" name. Her dream is to become a famous actress, and she constantly tries to grasp leading roles at various plays, but with no result, as she is completely talentless. Her main profession is waiting at the same bar in which Eleni works. She is also Manthos' fiancée and main love interest, among many.
Vasilis Koukouras as "Manthos Foustanos": Konstantinos' best friend with a huge ego. He is a lazy playboy, the only son of a rich industrialist, who enjoys having intercourse with many women. He is almost always shown to be in a relationship with Peggy during the series, who eventually becomes his only girlfriend. He loves expensive sportscars and enjoys driving his Porsche. A running gag of the show is that he is usually seen trying to hide from his girlfriends the existence of his other girlfriends, usually by a close call.
Kallirroi Miriagou as "Matina Mantarinaki": Eleni's second best friend and neighbor. She is a very punctual person who always provides Eleni with food and likes being in her company, even when the latter teases her about her non-existent love life. With no self-esteem, Matina has assured herself that she's probably never going to get married, although she often tries to attract men. She has a constant crush on Konstantinos and Nikolas, who both avoid her at any cost.
Stergios Nenes as "Nicolas Varthaculias": He is the bartender in the bar in which Eleni and Peggy work. He drives a Harley Davidson which is well beyond his means and hasn't paid off even after the series' end. He is shown to have occasional relationships.

Recurring cast 
 Ilias Zervos as "Nikos Grevias": Konstantinos' lawyer.
 Eleni Filippa as  "Elli Roussou": Eleni's lawyer, and past love interest of Nikolas.
 Lilian Arhonti as "Fiona Makri": Love interest of Manthos.
 Marianna Marteli as "Lila": Love interest of Manthos.
 Hrisa Kontogiorgou as "Joanna": Love interest of Manthos.
 Thanasis Papageorgiou as "Lefteris Anagnostou": Student of Konstantinos.
 Konstantina Halkiopoulou as "Maria Boukouvala": Student of Konstantinos.
 Giorgos Samolis as "Alkis Ioannou": Student of Konstantinos.
 Maria Paleologou as "Nitsa Voupoura": Neighbor of Konstantinos and Eleni, the ugly greengrocer of the neighborhood.

Episodes 
A total of 68 episodes have been broadcast; thirty-three in the first season and thirty-five in the second season.

Season 1 (1998–1999) 
The season started on 12 October 1998 and finished on 7 June 1999. It included thirty-three episodes.

Season 2 (1999–2000) 
The season started on 11 October 1999 and finished on 19 June 2000. It included thirty-five episodes.

References

External links 
Konstantinou kai Elenis official site 
Konstantinou kai Elenis episodes 

1998 Greek television series debuts
2000 Greek television series endings
1990s Greek television series
2000s Greek television series
Greek-language television shows
ANT1 original programming
Greek comedy television series